Blood Strangers is a two-part British television crime drama, written by Gwyneth Hughes and directed by Jon Jones, that broadcast across two consecutive nights in February 2002 on ITV. The series was commissioned by ITV in January 2001, as one of two new projects to star Caroline Quentin, with the other, Hot Money, broadcasting in December 2001. Nick Elliott, then controller of drama at ITV, described Quentin as being "...very good at playing very ordinary women." The series was described by ITV as "an emotionally charged two-part thriller that looks at the devastating effect of teenage prostitution on two respectable British families." Paul McGann, Sheridan Smith, David Crellin and Ray Panthaki are also credited as principal members of the cast.

More than nine million viewers tuned in for both episodes. The Guardian described the series' success as "ITV's respite from the ratings doldrums." The series was nominated for a PRIX Italia television award in 2002. Quentin commented of her role as Lin Beresford; "It's a strange feeling when you wake up and know you're going to spend the whole day grieving. Every morning I'd be thinking, `Oh no, I have to grieve all over again'. But I was determined to do it and all the tears you see are real. They're all mine. I've got quite a good emotional imagination, but having a daughter of my own made it easier to tap into that sorrow. All I had to do was imagine that the child lying dead on the hospital bed was my own and you're away. I can't imagine anything more awful than losing a child, I really can't."

Cast
 Caroline Quentin as Lin Beresford
 Paul McGann as DC David Ingram
 Siobhan Finneran as WPC Melanie Whitaker
 Sheridan Smith as Jas Dyson 
 David Crellin as Nick Beresford
 Ray Panthaki as Zafar Wahid
 Daine McCormick as Ant Beresford
 Rita May as Pat Beresford
 Lucy Hodgkinson as Emma Beresford
 Samantha Jayatilaka as Kalsoom Ikram
 Suraj Dass as Shakil Ikram
 Dennis Conlon	as Sohel Ikram
 Shireen Shah as Jamila Ikram
 Parvez Qadir as Manzar Wadid
 Miriam Ali as Maahin Wahid
 Andrew Readman as DCS Alastair Fleming
 Martin Walsh as DC Paul Mayhew
 Steve Evets as Benny Nightingale
 Stacey Hamlin	as Lauren Nightingale
 Caroline O'Neill as Jenna Albury
 Lynda Steadman as Stacey Ingram
 Naomi Bridges	as Jessica Ingram
 Samantha Jones as Anne-Marie Bennett
 Angela Forrest as Margery Hopper
 Amanda Tyrell	as PC Bernadette Gilligan
 Ced Beaumont as Donald Murphy

Episodes

References

External links

2002 British television series debuts
2002 British television series endings
2000s British crime drama television series
2000s British television miniseries
ITV television dramas
Television series by ITV Studios
Television shows produced by Granada Television
English-language television shows
Television shows set in England
Films directed by Jon Jones (director)